"" is a 2023 song by Portuguese singer-songwriter Mimicat. The song will represent Portugal in the Eurovision Song Contest 2023 after winning  2023, the Portuguese national final for that year's Eurovision Song Contest.

Release 
The lyric video was released on 's official YouTube channel on 19 January 2023, along with all other songs competing in  2023. The songs were subsequently released on digital streaming sites on 27 January 2023. On 19 January 2023, Mimicat was announced to be performing her song, titled "Ai coração".

Eurovision Song Contest

Festival da Canção 2023 
On 11 November 2022, Mimicat was announced as a participating songwriter of  2023, Portugal's national selection for the Eurovision Song Contest 2023. On 19 January 2023, Mimicat was announced to be performing her song, titled "". She competed in the first semi-final on 26 February 2023. In the final, held on 12 March 2023, she won both the jury vote and the televote, placing first overall with 24 points, becoming the Portuguese representative at the Eurovision Song Contest 2023.

At Eurovision 
According to Eurovision rules, all nations with the exceptions of the host country and the "Big Five" (France, Germany, Italy, Spain and the United Kingdom) are required to qualify for one of two semi-finals in order to compete for the final; the top 10 countries from each semi-final progress to the final. The European Broadcasting Union (EBU) split up the competing countries into six different pots based on voting patterns from previous contests, with countries with favourable voting histories put into the same pot. On 31 January 2023, an allocation draw was held, which placed each country into one of the two semi-finals, and determined which half of the show they would perform in. Portugal has been placed into the first semi-final, to be held on 9 May 2023, and has been scheduled to perform in the first half of the show.

References 

2023 songs
2023 singles
Eurovision songs of Portugal
Eurovision songs of 2023
Portuguese songs
Portuguese-language songs